Linostoma is a genus of flowering plants belonging to the family Thymelaeaceae.

Its native range is Assam to Southeastern China and Western Malesia.

Species:

Linostoma decandrum 
Linostoma longiflorum 
Linostoma pauciflorum 
Linostoma persimile

References

Thymelaeaceae
Malvales genera